Kaus or KAUS may refer to:

Stars
 Three stars in the constellation Sagittarius:
 Kaus Borealis (Lambda Sagittarii)
 Kaus Media (Delta Sagittarii)
 Kaus Australis (Epsilon Sagittarii)

Radio stations
 KAUS (AM), an American radio station
 KAUS-FM, an American radio station

Other uses
 Kaus (surname)
 Qos (deity), national god of the Edomites
 Austin–Bergstrom International Airport, Texas, United States (by ICAO airport code)

See also
 Kauss
 Caus (disambiguation)
 Kos (disambiguation)
 Kaykaus (disambiguation)